El-Hassan Mahta (born 2 October 1965) is a Moroccan alpine skier. He competed in three events at the 1992 Winter Olympics.

References

1965 births
Living people
Moroccan male alpine skiers
Olympic alpine skiers of Morocco
Alpine skiers at the 1992 Winter Olympics
Place of birth missing (living people)